Lothar Baier (16 May 1942 – 11 July 2004) was a German author, publisher, translator and co-founder of the Literary periodical Text+Kritik.

Baier was born in Karlsruhe.
He was accepted as one of the most profound German thinkers of the Francophone World and was recognized with the 1982 Jean Améry Prize for Essayists and with the 2003 Gerrit Engelke Prize.  Baier published amongst others in the Merkur, in the Kursbuch and in the Deutschlandfunk and was for many years the editor of the Die Wochenzeitung (WOZ) in Zürich.

On 11 July 2004, Baier committed suicide in Montreal, Quebec, Canada.

Works
Über Ror Wolf. Editor, Frankfurt am Main: Suhrkamp 1972
Französischen Zustände. Berichte und Essays (French State. Reports and Essays). Frankfurt am Main: Europäische Verlagsanstalt 1982.
Jahrsfrist. Frankfurt am Main: Fischer Verlag 1985
Firma Frankreich. Eine Betriebsbesichtigung (Company France. A Business Report). Berlin: Wagenbach 1988.
Gleichheitszeichen. Streitschriften über Abweichung und Identität (Identical Signs. Argumentative Writing about Allowance and Identity). Berlin: Wagenbach 1985.
Un allemand né de la dernière guerre. essai. Paris: Calmann-Lévy 1989.
Volk ohne Zeit. Essay über das eilige Vaterland (People without Time. Essay about a Hurried Fatherland). Berlin: Wagenbach 1990.
Zeichen und Wunder. Kritiken und Essays (Signs and Wonder.  Critiques and Essays). Berlin: Ed. Tiamat 1990.
Die große Ketzerei. Verfolgung und Ausrottung der Katharer durch Kirche und Wissenschaft (The Great Heresy. Persecution and Extermination through Church and Science). Berlin: Wagenbach 1991.
 "Farewell to Regionalism". Telos 90 (Winter 1991-2). New York: Telos Press
Christoph Hein. Texte, Daten, Bilder (Christoph Hein. Texts, Dates, Pictures). Editor, Frankfurt am Main: Luchterhand 1990.
Die verleugnete Utopie. Zeitkritische Texte (The Denied Utopia. Time Critical Texts). Berlin: Aufbau 1993.
Ostwestpassagen. Kulturwandel – Sprachzeiten (East West Passages. Cultural Change – Language Times). München: Antje Kunstmann 1995.
Keine Zeit. 18 Versuche über die Beschleunigung (No Time. 18 Attempts at Acceleration). München: Antje Kunstmann 2000.
Anders schreibendes Amerika. Eine Anthologie der Literatur aus Quebec 1945 – 2000 (Other Literary America. An anthology of the Literature from Quebec 1945–2000). Editors Lothar Baier and Pierre Filion. Heidelberg: Verlag Wunderhorn 2000.
Was wird Literatur? (What becomes Literature?) München: Antje Kunstmann 2001

External links
Literature by and on Lothar Baier in the Catalog of the German National Library 
Short Biography 
Obituary from the Publisher Klaus Bittermann 
In einer anderen Welt (In another World) Obituary in the WOZ by Susan Boos 
Obituary in the Freitag by Erich Hackl 
Ein Schweigen aus Montreal (A Silence from Montreal) Obituary in the WOZ by Stefan Keller 
Einen Meister verloren (A Master Left) Obituary in the WOZ by Paul Parin 
In Kants Republik (In Kant's Republic) Obituary in the WOZ by Manfred Züfle 
Die Flucht des Buchstabenmenschen: Zum Tod Lothar Baiers (The Flight of the Lettered People: On Lothar Baier's Death Obituary in the WELT from July 15, 2004 
Eine Art schattenloser Existenz (An Art of Shadowless Existence) 
A Selection of his books with Table of Contents 

1942 births
2004 deaths
German essayists
Heinrich Mann Prize winners
German writers in French
20th-century German non-fiction writers
21st-century German male writers
German male essayists
20th-century essayists
2004 suicides
Suicides in Quebec